Felicia Yap (born November 1980) is a Malaysia-born author. Her debut novel, a thriller titled Yesterday, was the subject of a bidding war by publishers.

Early life
Yap was born in November 1980 and raised in Kuala Lumpur. Her father refilled ATMs for a living and her mother was a clerk in a car repair shop.

Education and career
In 2000 Yap began to study biochemistry at Imperial College London, after which she worked as a researcher at the European Molecular Biology Laboratory in Heidelberg. She then switched to studying history at the University of Cambridge, completing a master's degree at Sidney Sussex College and a doctorate at St Catharine's College on the subject of prisoners of the Japanese during the Second World War. In 2007, she was elected a junior research fellow at Wolfson College, Cambridge.

Yap worked as a journalist in Singapore and the United Kingdom and has written for The Economist and The Business Times. Her debut novel was a thriller titled Yesterday, followed by her second novel titled Future Perfect.

Selected publications
Future Perfect. London: Headline, 2021.
 Yesterday. New York: Mulholland Books, 2017.

References

Living people
People from Kuala Lumpur
1980 births
Malaysian non-fiction writers
Alumni of Imperial College London
Alumni of Sidney Sussex College, Cambridge
Alumni of St Catharine's College, Cambridge
Fellows of Wolfson College, Cambridge
Malaysian journalists
Malaysian women journalists
Malaysian emigrants to the United Kingdom
Malaysian women writers
21st-century journalists
21st-century Malaysian women writers